Tendo Mukalazi (born June 15, 2002)  is a Ugandan  swimmer. In the 2022 Commonwealth Games, he represented Uganda in swimming where he participated in four different events; men’s 50m freestyle, men’s 100m freestyle, Mixed 4x 100m freestyle relay, Mixed 4x 100m Medley Relay and in the men’s 50m Breaststroke.

Early life
Tendo was born and raised in Kampala the capital city of Uganda.  He attends British School Kampala.  Tendo is the eldest child. His mother, Hadija Namanda, is the former president of the Uganda Volleyball Federation. Tendo began swimming at the age of seven.

Swimming Career
He was the second runner-up at CANA Zone III Championships in Dar-es-Salam in 2017 in Tanzania where he won four gold medals and four silver medals.

Training
Mukalazi is coached by Muzafaru Muwanguzi.

Records

Personal bests

References

External links
https://www.tendomukalazi.com/  Official website
 Tendo Mukalazi on Instagram

2002 births
Living people
Ugandan male freestyle swimmers
Olympic swimmers of Uganda
Swimmers at the 2020 Summer Olympics
21st-century Ugandan men
Swimmers at the 2022 Commonwealth Games
Commonwealth Games competitors for Uganda